Fatima College, Madurai, is a women's general degree college located in Madurai, Tamil Nadu. It was established in the year 1953. The college is affiliated with Madurai Kamaraj University. This college offers different courses in arts, commerce and science.

Departments

Science
Zoology
physics
Chemistry
Mathematics
Computer Science
Home Science with Food Biotechnology
Information Technology

Arts and Commerce

Tamil
English
History
Economics
Sociology
Social Work
Commerce

Accreditation
The college is  recognized by the University Grants Commission (UGC).

References

External links

Educational institutions established in 1953
1953 establishments in Madras State
Colleges affiliated to Madurai Kamaraj University
Colleges in Madurai
Universities and colleges in Madurai district
Universities and colleges in Madurai
Academic institutions formerly affiliated with the University of Madras